Exarch Joseph I (also known as Iosif I, secular name Lazar Yovchev, ; May 5, 1840, Kalofer, Ottoman Empire – June 20, 1915, Sofia, Bulgaria) was a Bulgarian Exarch from 1877 to 1915. He has great merits for preserving the unity of the Bulgarian Orthodox Church and for the Bulgarian educational and ecclesiastical work in Macedonia and Thrace, which remained in the Ottoman Empire after 1878.

His grave is marked with a white cross and a bed with flowers, it is located on the south side of the church "St. Nedelya" in Sofia, near the side altar door.

Note 

Bishops of the Bulgarian Orthodox Church
Members of the Bulgarian Academy of Sciences
Burials at St Nedelya Church
People from Kalofer
Exarchs of Bulgaria
19th-century Bulgarian people
1840 births
1915 deaths